Cast may refer to:

Music
 Cast (band), an English alternative rock band 
 Cast (Mexican band), a progressive Mexican rock band
 The Cast, a Scottish musical duo: Mairi Campbell and Dave Francis
 Cast, a 2012 album by Trespassers William
 Cast, a 2018 album by KAT-TUN

Science and technology
 Casting (metalworking)
 Cast iron, a group of iron-carbon alloys
 Cast (geology), a cavity formed by decomposition that once were covered by a casing material
 Cast, visible piles of mineral-rich organic matter excreted above ground by earthworms
 Cast of the eye, a condition in which the eyes do not properly align with each other when looking at an object
 Orthopedic cast, a protective shell to hold a limb in place, for example to help in healing broken bones 
 Cast (computer science), to change the interpretation of a bit pattern from one data type to another in computer programming
 Urinary cast, tubules found in urine
 Google Cast, a protocol built into the Google Chromecast and other embedded technologies
 Game cast of a video game

Sports
 Cast (archery), the distance a bow can shoot its arrow
 Cast, in falconry, to fly two or more falconry birds together
 Cast, in fishing, to cast a line refers to the act of throwing bait or a lure using a fishing line out over the water using a flexible fishing rod

Other uses
 Cast member, one of the performers in a play, movie, or other performing art form
 Cast, the casting of a magic spell
 Plaster cast, a copy made in plaster of another three-dimensional form, such as a sculpture
 Cast, Finistère, a commune of the Finistère département, France
 Cast, a theatre venue in Doncaster, UK

People with the name
 Kristin Cast (born 1986), coauthor of the House of Night series with her mother P.C. Cast
 P. C. Cast (born 1960), American romance/fantasy coauthor of the House of Night series with her daughter Kristin Cast

See also
 CAST (disambiguation)
 Caste (disambiguation)
 Casting (disambiguation)
 The die is cast (Latin: Alea iacta est)
 "The Die Is Cast" (Star Trek: Deep Space Nine), an episode of Star Trek: Deep Space Nine